Tessa Ganserer (born Markus Ganserer; 16 May 1977) is a German politician who has served as a member of the Bundestag since 26 October 2021. Previously, she was a member of the Landtag of Bavaria, representing the constituency of Middle Franconia on the Alliance '90/The Greens list. In 2018 Ganserer came out as a transgender woman, becoming the first openly transgender person in a German state or federal parliament.

Early life and career 
Tessa Ganserer was born as Markus Ganserer on 16 May 1977 in Zwiesel, Bavaria. She studied forestry and engineering at Weihenstephan-Triesdorf University of Applied Science, graduating in 2005. Later that year she worked as a staffer for German politician Christian Magerl.

Political career

Early beginnings
Ganserer belongs to Alliance 90/The Greens, a green political party, and has been a member since 1998. She ran for a seat in the Landtag of Bavaria in 2008 but was unsuccessful. From 2008 to 2018 she served as the District Executive of the Green Middle Franconia.

State politics
In the 2013 elections, Ganserer was elected in the Nuremberg North electoral district to sit in the Landtag. She sat on the committees for Economic and Media Affairs, Infrastructure, Construction and Transport, Energy and Technology, and as Vice Chair of Public Service from 2013 until 2018.

In December 2018 Ganserer came out as transgender woman, becoming the first member of the Landtag of Bavaria and of a German parliament to be openly transgender. She made her first public appearance as a woman at a press conference in Munich on 14 January 2019. Ilse Aigner, a member of the Christian Social Union in Bavaria and President of the Landtag of Bavaria, supported Ganserer in her transition and welcomed her to parliament as a woman. While her gender change has not yet been legally finalized, Ganserer was recognized in the Landtag as a woman.

In 2019, Ganserer pushed for reform to make name changes and sex changes on identity documents more accessible.

National politics 
In the 2021 German Federal Election, Ganserer was elected to the Bundestag on the Alliance 90/The Greens list for Bavaria. Because her government records remain unchanged, she was forced to appear on the ballot under her deadname.Along with fellow Green Nyke Slawik, Ganserer became the first openly transgender person elected to the German Parliament.

In parliament, Ganserer has been serving on the Committee on the Environment, Nature Conservation, Nuclear Safety, and Consumer Protection and the Parliamentary Advisory Board on Sustainable Development.

Other activities 
 Magnus Hirschfeld Foundation, Deputy Member of the Board of Trustees (since 2022)

Personal life 
Ganserer is married to Ines Eichmüller and has two sons.

Ganserer has not changed her legally recorded name and gender in protest against the German Transsexual Law, which requires two psychological evaluations by court-appointed evaluators to validate a person's transgender identity. Ganserer has described these as "degrading compulsory appraisals". The law also used to require sterilization, which was deemed unconstitutional by the Federal Constitutional Court in 2011.

References

External links

Living people
1977 births
Alliance 90/The Greens politicians
Members of the Bundestag 2021–2025
LGBT legislators in Germany
LGBT members of the Bundestag
Members of the Landtag of Bavaria
People from Regen (district)
Transgender politicians
Transgender women
German transgender people
Women members of State Parliaments in Germany
21st-century German women politicians